Ayça Damgacı (born 1973) is a Turkish actress. She is best known for her role in the 2008 movie My Marlon and Brando , which earned her the Best Actress award at the Sarajevo Film Festival.

She initially planned on studying economics but later became interested in acting. She first took acting lessons at the Şahika Tekand Acting and Art Studio, before graduating from Istanbul University School of Literature with a degree in theatre studies. She then joined Tiyatro Oyunevi as a cast member. Damgacı also worked as a soloist for the band Göçebe Şarkılar. Between 2013 and 2015, she had a recurring role in Star TV's Aramızda Kalsın series as Hatçik. Between 2015 and 2016, she was among the casr of O Hayat Benim. Since 2018, she has been portraying the character of Hasret in the series Avlu, which later became available for streaming on Netflix.

Filmography 
 My Marlon and Brando (2008; film)
 Ay Lav Yu (2010; film)
 Yozgat Blues (2013; film)
 Aramızda Kalsın (2013–2015; TV series)
 O Hayat Benim (2015–2016; TV series)
 Avlu (2018–; TV series)

Theatre 
 Yala Ama Yutma!
 Beklerken
 İstanbul'da Bir Dava
 Dillerde Günahkar
 Döne Döne
 Unutmak
 Ormanların Hemen Önündeki Gece
 Evlenme
 Ceza Kolonisinde
 Bebek Fil
 Biraz Sen, Biraz Ben

Awards 
 27th International Istanbul Film Festival - Gitmek, Best Actress
 15th Golden Boll Film Festival - Gitmek, Best Actress (shared with Selen Uçer)
 14th Sarajevo Film Festival, Gitmek, Best Actress
 14th Turkey/Germany Film Festival Nurnberg, Gitmek, Best Actress

References

External links 
 

1973 births
Turkish film actresses
Turkish stage actresses
Turkish television actresses
Living people